George Albert Scharein (November 21, 1914 – December 23, 1981) was a shortstop in Major League Baseball. He played for the Philadelphia Phillies.

References

External links

1914 births
1981 deaths
Major League Baseball shortstops
Philadelphia Phillies players
Baseball players from Illinois
Sportspeople from Decatur, Illinois
Nashville Vols players